The Gospel Reflector was the first independent Mormon periodical. It was published by Benjamin Winchester, the president of the Philadelphia Branch of the Church of Jesus Christ of Latter Day Saints.

The Gospel Reflector was published bi-weekly beginning in January 1841 and ended with the twelfth issue in June 1841. Its motto was "When God works who can hinder?"

See also

The Evening and the Morning Star
Messenger and Advocate
Elders' Journal
Millennial Star
List of Latter Day Saint periodicals

Notes

External links
The Gospel Reflector (PDF scans) courtesy of the L. Tom Perry Special Collections, Harold B. Lee Library, Brigham Young University.

Defunct newspapers of Philadelphia
Latter Day Saint periodicals
Newspapers established in 1841
Publications disestablished in 1841
Latter Day Saint movement in Pennsylvania
1841 in Christianity
19th-century Mormonism